Spruce Home is a small farming community north of Saskatchewan's third largest city, Prince Albert.  The first post office opened in 1908 at Sec.32, Twp.50, R.26, W2 surviving in this location for 9 years.  This unincorporated area  had post offices come and go over the years.

Education
Spruce Home has an elementary school which is a part of the Saskatchewan Rivers School Division.

Currently the school has about 138 students.

Sports

Area statistics
Dominion Land Survey Sec.16 Tsp 51  Rge 26 W2

External links
Map location of Spruce Home
Post Offices and Postmasters - ArchiviaNet - Library and Archives Canada
Prince Albert Gen Web Region
Saskatchewan, Canada, Rand McNally 1924 Indexed Pocket Map Tourists' and Shippers' Guide
GeoNames Query 
Spruce Home on Googe Maps

Buckland No. 491, Saskatchewan
Unincorporated communities in Saskatchewan
Division No. 15, Saskatchewan